This article details the fixtures and results of the Iraq national football team in 2012.

Schedule

Friendlies

External links
iraq-football.net/ 
iraqfc.webs.com/